Gandikota Reservoir is an irrigation project located across Penna River of Andhra Pradesh in the Indian state. It receives water from Galeru Nagari Sujala Sravanthi Project canal. It is located between Gandikota village and Kondapur village of Kadapa district.

Details

This project was started as a part of Jalayagnam program. It was inaugurated on 22 September 2013. The reservoir with gross storage capacity of 26.84 tmcft is located in Penna River Basin. This reservoir act as a Balancing reservoir to supply Krishna river water into Penna River basin in Kadapa district, Nellore district and Chittoor district.

Irrigation

Gandikota lift irrigation scheme is also a part of this reservoir. There are two stages in this scheme. The first stage is to supply water to Pulivendula Branch canal and the second stage is to supply water into Chitravati Balancing reservoir.

Displacement of people 
The project has displaced around 43,200 people across several villages. Thousands were rendered homeless owing to the submergence of their villages and others have been demanding compensation for their lands. In December 2020, the Andhra Pradesh High Court dismissed a PIL seeking a stay on evictions.

References

Irrigation districts